3-Chloropropanoic acid (also 3-chloropropionic acid) is the organic compound with the formula ClCH2CH2CO2H.  A white or colorless solid, it is used as a drug and a synthetic intermediate.  The compound is produced by the hydrochlorination of acrylic acid.

With the name UMB66, this compound is a drug used in scientific research. It is structurally related to GHB and binds to the GHB receptor, but has no affinity for GABA receptors. It is also an active ingredient in some herbicide blends. Overdose may cause unconsciousness and/or convulsions.

References 

Convulsants
Organochlorides
GHB receptor agonists
Propionic acids